Montagut d'Ancosa is a mountain of Catalonia, Spain. It has an elevation of 963 metres above sea level.

References

Mountains of Catalonia